Buckeye Steel Castings was a Columbus, Ohio steelmaker best known today for its longtime president, Samuel P. Bush, who was the grandfather of President George H. W. Bush and great-grandfather of President George W. Bush.

Buckeye, named for the Ohio Buckeye tree, was founded in Columbus as the Murray-Hayden Foundry, which made iron farm implements. Finding success in manufacturing iron railroad car couplers, the name changed to the Buckeye Automatic Car Coupler Company in 1891 and Buckeye Malleable Iron and Coupler Company in 1894. Eventually, demand for stronger coupling assemblies led to a switch to steel and the name Buckeye Steel Castings.

The business was closely associated with rail baron E.H. Harriman, and for some time, was controlled by Frank Rockefeller, the brother of oil magnate John D. Rockefeller. In 1901, Buckeye hired Samuel Prescott "S.P." Bush as general manager. Bush, a graduate of Stevens Institute of Technology, had worked his way up from apprentice mechanic at the locally based Pittsburgh, Cincinnati, Chicago and St. Louis Railroad to superintendent of motive power at that railroad, and, briefly, the Milwaukee Road. In 1908, Rockefeller departed, and Bush took over as president, a job he would hold until 1928. During this period, Bush became known as a top industrialist and had political influence in Washington, D.C.

Bush had an advanced business outlook for his day and implemented many modern management techniques as well as an unusually generous working environment.

In 1967, the parent company Buckeye International, Inc. was formed, and then was acquired in 1980 by Worthington Industries through a stock merger. Worthington sold Buckeye Steel in 1999, but it went bankrupt in 2002.

The former president of Worthington, Donald Malenick, formed an investment group to purchase the assets of Buckeye, and has reopened the business as Columbus Steel Castings. Columbus Steel Castings closed in bankruptcy in 2016.

See also 
 Janney coupler

References

External links 
Columbus Steel Castings website
Buckeye Steel Castings Company Stock Certificate
Scientific Management and Welfare Work in Early Twentieth Century American Business: The Buckeye Steel Castings Company - from Ohio History, the scholarly journal of the Ohio Historical Society

American companies established in 1881
Bush family
Rockefeller family
Defunct companies based in Columbus, Ohio
Steel companies of the United States
1881 establishments in Ohio